The Sidi-Hamed massacre took place on the night of January 11, 1998 (the last day of Ramadan), in the town of Sidi-Hamed (or Sidi-Hammad), 30 km south of Algiers. An estimated fifty gunmen participated, attacking children and adults; they bombed a cafe where films were being watched and a mosque in nearby Haouche Sahraoui, killing those who fled, and entered houses to kill those within. According to official figures, 103 were killed and seventy injured, including two pro-government fighters and five of the attackers. Other sources indicate a higher toll; AFP supposedly counted over 120 corpses, and some Algerian newspapers claimed 400. Thirty girls were reportedly kidnapped. The massacre was generally blamed on the Armed Islamic Group of Algeria (GIA). One newspaper claimed that survivors blamed it on the Islamic Salvation Front (AIS).

See also
 List of Algerian massacres of the 1990s

External links
 Algerian media report more killings, BBC, 12 January 1998
 New massacre reported in Algeria, BBC, 12 January 1998
 1998: 100 die in massacre in Algeria, BBC, 11 January 1998
 Sidi Hamed : les intégristes tuent plus de cent civils, Web de l'Humanite, 13 January 1998 (french)
 Death toll of latest massacre in Algeria 400 , Turkish Daily News
 Sidi Hamed : les rescapés accusent l’AIS, Web de l'Humanite, 14 January 1998 (french)

Algerian massacres of the 1990s
1998 in Algeria
Massacres in 1998
Conflicts in 1998
January 1998 events in Africa